Allen J. Clements is an American filmmaker and Senior Producer at MAKE films from Lancaster, Pennsylvania.  He was also co-founder of Animation/VFX firm Postage, Inc.  A native to Lafayette, LA and a 2003 graduate of University of Louisiana at Lafayette, he's known for his participation as a guitarist and vocalist in several prominent indie rock bands including Claymore and Victim of Modern Age. His film work includes producing and directing cinematic and animated films, commercials, and promotional pieces.

Early life, education
Allen Clements was born and raised in Lafayette, Louisiana. His father was a commercial artist who served as art director for a local television station, as well as a print man. Clements frequently tagged along with his father at work.

While in highschool he sang lead vocals in the garage band Drive-In Funeral. Starting in 1994 the band played shows with acts such as Rare Avis, Urbo Sleeks, Jimmy Eat World, and Evil Nurse Sheila. The group disbanded in 1997.

In 1998 Clements began attending the University of Louisiana at Lafayette. From 1998 to 2000 he worked as a network administrator at a media production company, and as a graphics specialist at KATC Communications. He also worked as a program producer for KRVS Radio Acadie, the public service and NPR affiliate of the university, from 2001 to 2002. He began working as a Sales and Marketing Director for Channel One Film and Video in 2001, a position he held until 2005. Clements graduated in May 2003 with a degree in Marketing and Business Administration.

Music career
While attending college, Clements and three other students formed the indie punk band Claymore, with Clements handling both vocals and guitar. In September 2002 he was invited to join as a guitarist and vocalist with the Lafayette indie band Victim of Modern Age. The band and Clements toured the east coast performing. In 2003 began recording their sophomore album Channels Like Capillaries, which was released on Universal Warning Records. Clements and Bobby Nixon both provides vocals and guitar, and the album was a mixture of rock, pop, punk, and alternative. During its run the band performed with groups such as Benton Falls, Hey Mercedes, Liars Academy, Mae, Red Animal War, Jet By Day, Twothirtyeight, and Brand New.

After Victim of Modern Age disbanded in 2004, Clements was asked to join the Lancaster, Pennsylvania-based band Sadaharu. Clements set up residence in the new city. After leaving Sadaharu, Clements continues to occasionally to perform his own solo material under the moniker "A. Premise."

Media career

Second Fiction, LLC 
In 2012, Clements took part in a video game / mobile game startup studio, Second Fiction, LLC with several games in production.

Postage, Inc. / theFictory 
After moving to Lancaster to join Sadaharu, Clements founded the film and media production company Otaku Motion in 2006. In 2009 he reformed Otaku Motion as Postage, Inc. with his partner Joseph Krzemienski. The company produces animated shorts, documentaries, and advertisements. Clements and Krzemienski have also founded theFictory, a sister studio. Clements serves as executive producer and partner at Postage, Inc. and contributor to theFictory, while Krzemienski serves as art director and partner and Postage, Inc., and creator and director at theFictory. Through Postage, Inc, Clements has done work for Universal Warning Records, Baby Loves Disco, National Sexual Violence Resource Center, and Penske Corporation, and film projects include Choose and No Sanctuary.

Both Clements and Krzemienski are adjunct professors at Pennsylvania College of Art & Design, where they teach motion/video classes.

The Chameleon Club
In 2006 Clements began writing, producing, and directing the documentary The Chameleon Club, which was released in January 2011. The film is about Lancaster's historic music venue The Chameleon Club, and utilizes home movies, archival footage, old photos, and interviews.
Atomic Robo Last Stop
The completion of an animated short film based on a popular graphic novel was announced in 2013 including producer and other credits for Allen Clements.

Discography
Call Before You Dig by Muon Nutrino (1998)
Found Underneath by Claymore (2002) 
Channels Like Capillaries by Victim of Modern Age (2004)

Local Government
In November 2013, Clements was elected to Marietta Borough Council in Lancaster County Pennsylvania.

References

External links 

 

1978 births
Living people
American directors